Musa ibn 'Uqba al-Asadī (675–758), known with his honorific as Mūsā ibn ʿUqba, was an early Arab historian and traditionalist, and was also an expert on maghāzī, the military expeditions in which the Prophet of Islam Muhammad personally participated.

He composed a Kitāb al-maghāzī (Book on maghāzī) which is however cited by other historians after him, such as al-Wāqidī, Ṭabarī and Ibn Kathīr.  The manuscript of Kitab al-maghazi was recently rediscovered and is due to be published (per July 2022).

References

675 births
758 deaths
8th-century historians of the medieval Islamic world
8th-century Arabic writers
7th-century Arabs
8th-century Arabs
Tabi‘un